Baron Prášil is the Czech name for the historical and literary character Baron Munchausen.

The name may also refer to:

 Baron Prášil (1940), a comedy film starring Vlasta Burian
 Baron Prášil (1961), a film by Karel Zeman